Stylidium kunthii is a dicotyledonous plant that belongs to the genus Stylidium (family Stylidiaceae) and is one of the few species in the genus that is not native to Australia. It is an erect annual plant that grows from 8 to 20 cm tall. Obovate, orbicular, or obleanceolate leaves, about 5-15 per plant, form terminal rosettes with some scattered along the stems. The leaves are generally 4–15 mm long and 2–9 mm wide. This species generally has one to five scapes and cymose inflorescences that are 5–14 cm long. Flowers are white or pink. S. kunthii has a wide distribution in Southeast Asia, ranging from eastern India to Myanmar, Bengal, and Vietnam. Its typical habitats include the wet soils of rice fields, natural grasslands, and road cuttings at an altitude of less than 200 metres. It flowers from November to December. S. kunthii is most closely related to S. uliginosum, but differs by the cauline leaves.

See also 
 List of Stylidium species

References 

Carnivorous plants of Asia
Flora of India (region)
kunthii